Mary Martin (born Norma Martin, and sometimes credited as Marty Martin, especially early on in her career) was a silent film actress who was active in Hollywood in the 1910s. Mary was born in Fresno, California. In 1914, she moved to Santa Barbara, where she quickly began appearing in a string of silent films with the American Film Company, also known as Flying A Studios. She married actor-director Rae Berger in 1916 and seems to have retired from acting around 1917.

Selected filmography 

 A Modern Othello (1914)
 A Modern Rip Van Winkle (1914)
 The Birth of Emotion (1914)
 Greater Love Hath No Man (1915)
 The Vampire (1915)
 The Honeymooners (1915)
 The Wonderful Adventure (1915)
 Good Out of Evil (1915)
 The Broken Law (1915)
 Some Night (1916)
 Hazel Kirke (1916)
 The Eternal Sappho (1916)
 Daredevil Kate (1916)
 The Vixen (1916)
 The Scarlet Letter (1917)
 The Tiger Woman (1917)
 The Derelict (1917)
 The Heart of a Lion (1917)

References 

American silent film actresses
20th-century American actresses
Actresses from Fresno, California
Date of birth missing